The Numeralla River, a perennial river that is part of the Murrumbidgee catchment within the Murray–Darling basin, is located in the Monaro region of New South Wales, Australia.

The name of the river is claimed to derive from an Aboriginal word meaning "valley of plenty", but Flavia Hodges has called this etymology "highly suspect".

Course

The river is a diverse ecosystem rich with many different animal species such as the uncommonly seen Wanderer's Kingfisher and the Kiora frog. Its native freshwater fish fauna had been entirely replaced by introduced trout species, now replaced by the introduced European carp species; a common situation in south-east Australia.

Alluvial gold was discovered in and along the river in 1858, with the diggings worked until 1868.

See also

 List of rivers of New South Wales (L–Z)
 List of rivers of Australia
 Rivers of New South Wales

References

Rivers of New South Wales
Tributaries of the Murrumbidgee River
Bombala railway line